The 2011 West Lancashire Borough Council election took place on 5 May 2011 to elect members of  West Lancashire Borough Council in Lancashire, England. One third of the council was up for election, with results compared to the corresponding vote in 2007 West Lancashire Council election.

Ward results

Ashurst

Aughton and Downholland

Aughton Park

Bickerstaffe

Birch Green

Derby

Digmoor

Knowsley

North Meols

Parbold

Rufford

Scarisbrick

Scott

Skelmersdale North

Skelmersdale South

Tanhouse

Tarleton

Up Holland

Wrightington

References

Borough Council Elections 2011 West Lancashire Borough Council

2011 English local elections
2011
2010s in Lancashire